This is a list of Wilkes-Barre/Scranton Penguins head coaches. There have been 10 head coaches of the Penguins franchise since its founding in 1999. Glenn Patrick, the brother of former-Pittsburgh Penguins general manager and coach Craig Patrick, served as the team's first head coach. Today the WBS Penguins are led by Clark Donatelli, who replaced Mike Sullivan after he was promoted to the Pittsburgh Penguins. Sullivan replaced John Hynes, who was hired by the New Jersey Devils in 2015. Before Hynes was Dan Bylsma, who replaced Todd Richards in June 2008, when Richards took an assistant coaching position with the San Jose Sharks. Patrick, Therrien, Richards, and Hynes led the WBS Pens to AHL Eastern Conference Championship titles.

Key

Coaches

References

 The Internet Hockey Database

External links 
Wilkes-Barre/Scranton Penguins official web site
 

Wilkes-Barre/Scranton Penguins